NGC 4630 is an irregular galaxy located about 54 million light-years away in the constellation of Virgo. NGC 4630 was discovered by astronomer William Herschel on February 2, 1786. NGC 4630 is part of the Virgo II Groups which form a southern extension of the Virgo Cluster.

See also 
 List of NGC objects (4001–5000)
 NGC 1427A

References

External links

Irregular galaxies
Virgo (constellation)
4630
42688
7871
Astronomical objects discovered in 1786